In Greek mythology, Syrinx was a nymph who was transformed into water reeds that were then fashioned into a musical instrument by the god Pan.

Syrinx may also refer to:

Music
 Syrinx (also known as panpipes or Pan flute), a musical instrument consisting of multiple pipes
 Simion Stanciu (1949–2010), Romanian pan flautist, stage name "Syrinx"
 Syrinx (Debussy), a piece of music for solo flute
 Syrinx (band), a Canadian electronic music group

Biology
 Syrinx (bird anatomy), the vocal organ of birds
 Syrinx (gastropod), a sea snail genus
 Syrinx (medicine), a fluid-filled cavity in the nervous system
 Caroline reed warbler (Acrocephalus syrinx), a bird

Other
 3360 Syrinx, an asteroid

See also